Winfried Hermann (born 19 July 1952 in Rottenburg am Neckar) is a German politician of Alliance '90/The Greens. From 1998 to 2011 he was an MP of the German Bundestag. Since 2011 he has been State Minister of Transport in the Cabinets Kretschmann I and II. From 1992 to 1997 he was chairman of The Greens in Baden-Württemberg.

Early life and career
After high school diploma Hermann studied German Philology, Political Science and Sports at the University of Tübingen. From 1979 to 1984 he was trained and worked as a high school teacher in Stuttgart.

Political career

Beginnings in state politics
In 1984 Hermann was elected to the Landtag of Baden-Württemberg for the Green Party, of which he was a member to 1988.

From 1992 until 1997, Hermann served as co-chair of the Green Party in Baden-Württemberg, alongside Dagmar Dehmer (1992–1993) and Barbara Graf (1995–1997).

Member of the German Parliament, 1998–2011
In 1998, Hermann was elected to the Bundestag. He was an MP of the Bundestag until 2011. In this capacity, he served as deputy chairman of the Committee on the Environment, Nature Conservation, Building and Nuclear Safety (1998-2005), member of the Parliamentary Advisory Board on Sustainability (2005-2009) and chairman of the Committee on Transport, Building and Urban Affairs (2009-2011). He was his parliamentary group's spokesperson on environmental policy (2002–2005) and on transportation policy (2005–2009).

While still in parliament, Hermann joined Gerhard Schick, Hans-Christian Ströbele and Anton Hofreiter in their successful 2011 constitutional complaint against the refusal of Chancellor Angela Merkel’s government to provide information on the Deutsche Bahn and financial market supervision. In its judgment pronounced in 2017, the Federal Constitutional Court held that the government had indeed failed to fulfil its duty to give answers in response to parliamentary queries and to sufficiently substantiating the reasons.

Return to state politics
In 2011, Hermann went back to Baden-Württemberg state politics and became State Minister for Transportation of the government of Winfried Kretschmann. As one of his state's representatives at the Bundesrat, he serves on the Committee on Transport. In the 2016 state elections, he was also re-elected into the Landtag of Baden-Württemberg.

Other actvitities

State agencies
 Federal Network Agency for Electricity, Gas, Telecommunications, Post and Railway (BNetzA), Member of the Rail Infrastructure Advisory Council (2005-2009)
 Federal Agency for Civic Education (BPB), Member of the Board of Trustees (1998-2005)

Corporate boards
 Stuttgart Airport, Ex-Officio Chairman of the Supervisory Board
 Deutsche Flugsicherung (DFS), Member of the Advisory Board
 Nahverkehrsgesellschaft Baden-Württemberg (NVBW), Ex-Officio Chairman of the Supervisory Board

Non-profits
 Institut Solidarische Moderne (ISM), Member (since 2010)

Personal life
Hermann lives in Stuttgart. He is married and has one child.

External links
Winfried Hermann at the Baden-Württemberg Transportation Ministry

References

Living people
1952 births
Members of the Landtag of Baden-Württemberg
Members of the Bundestag for Baden-Württemberg
People from Rottenburg am Neckar
University of Tübingen alumni
Members of the Bundestag 2009–2013
Members of the Bundestag 2005–2009
Members of the Bundestag 2002–2005
Members of the Bundestag for Alliance 90/The Greens